İbrahim Erkal  (10 October 1966 – 11 May 2017) was a Turkish singer, songwriter, composer and actor. Under the name İbrahim Güzelses, he released his first album in 1984. İbrahim Erkal released his first album under his own name in 1986 with the name Sensiz Yaşıyamam.

In 1993, he released Tutku, and in 1995 Sıra Bende/Aklımdasın. His third album, Gönlünüze Talibim, was released in 1996. The album has sold 1.4 million copies. Erkal was among the best-selling musicians of 1996 in Turkey and "Canısı" was one of the most popular songs. In 1997, he starred in the TV movie Canısı. The film ranked first in the ratings. In 1997, he played in the TV series based on the same movie. His fourth album, Sırılsıklam, was released in 1998. It sold 2.2 million copies, and was the second best-selling album of 1998 in Turkey. Erkal starred in a TV series at the end of 1998. 

In 2000 he published the album De Get Yalan Dünya, selling 1 million copies. Su Gibi (2001), Aşknâme (2002), Gönül Limanı (2004) and Yüreğinden Öpüyorum/Gülüm (2006) were all released under the Ulus Music label. In 2006, he left Ulus Music and released two albums afterwards. In 2015 he published his album Nefes 1.

On 12 April 2017, Erkal lost his balance due to low blood pressure and hit his head against the floor and suffered a cerebral hemorrhage. He was hospitalized and put under intensive care. On 9 May, it was reported that he had been diagnosed with brain death, yet the vital functions of his heart and other organs were sustained, depending on the external life support. Erkal died on 11 May 2017 at Ümraniye Eğitim ve Araştırma Hospital in Istanbul. On 13 May 2017, his funeral was held at Marmara İlahiyat Mosque and his body was later buried at Karacaahmet Cemetery.

Discography 
 Sarhoş Baki (1984)
 Sensiz Yaşıyamam (1986)
 Tutku (1993)
 Sıra Bende/Aklımdasın (1995)
 Gönlünüze Talibim (1996)
 Sırılsıklam (1998)
 De Get Yalan Dünya (2000)
 Su Gibi (2001)
 Aşknâme (2002)
 Gönül Limanı (2004)
 Yüreğinden Öpüyorum/Gülüm (2006)
 Aranağme (2008)
 Burnumda Tütüyorsun (2011)
 Nefes 1 (2015)
 Ömrüm (2017)

Other albums
 Ölümüne Cim Bom (1994) - "for Galatasaray"

Filmography
Film
 Canısı (1997)
Television
 Canısı (1997–98)
 Sırılsıklam (1998–99)
 Cennet Mahallesi (2006) "Guest cast"

Awards

References

External links
 Official website

1967 births
2017 deaths
20th-century Turkish male singers
21st-century Turkish male singers
Turkish folk singers
Turkish lyricists
Turkish folk-pop singers
Turkish composers
Burials at Karacaahmet Cemetery